

Players

Competitions

Division Two

League table

Results summary

League position by match

Matches

Play-offs

FA Cup

Coca-Cola Cup

Auto Windscreens Shield

Appearances, goals and cards

References

1997-98
Northampton Town
Northampton Town